Trinity Christian High School, formerly Calvary Christian High School, formerly Calvary Chapel High School is a private, coed, secondary Christian school in Monterey, California. It was established in 2001 by Calvary Chapel Church Monterey Bay as one of the first non-denominational Christian high schools in the Monterey Bay Area. The mission of Trinity Christian High School is to cultivate a stimulating environment, in partnership with the home and local church, which develops the whole student through a Biblically-based curriculum and through Christ-centered relationships in order to prepare the student to follow Jesus and to positively impact his/her community and the world.

Education programs

Trinity Christian High School teaches grades nine through twelve. In May 2010, the school was accredited by WASC (Western Association of Schools and Colleges) and ACSI (Association of Christian Schools International). As of October 2012, the student body contains 103 students. The school has a total of 8 full-time teachers and 8 part-time teachers, 40% of which have an advanced degree, and has an average classroom size of 20 students. The 2012-13 yearly tuition cost is US$9,200, the Principal is Rick Fitzgerald and the Director is Timothy S. Wong, and the Admissions Director is Kathi Lares.

References

Christian schools in California
High schools in Monterey County, California
Nondenominational Christian schools in the United States
Private high schools in California
2001 establishments in California